Ross Jones (born 11 January 1992) is a Welsh rugby union player. A full-back, he was educated at Castleknock College, Dublin where he played for the Junior and Senior Cup Teams, captaining the SCT in his final year in 2010.

References

External links
 

1992 births
Living people
Bridgend RFC players
Ospreys (rugby union) players
Rugby union players from Llanelli
Welsh rugby union players
Rugby union fullbacks